"Wherever You Are" is a song by Dublin-based alternative rock quartet Kodaline. The song was released on 10 January 2020 as the lead single from the band's fourth studio album One Day at a Time. The song peaked at number sixty-six on the Irish Singles Chart.

Background
When talking about the song, Steve Garrigan said, "Wherever You Are is about loved ones staying in your heart and mind even when they’re not with you. I wrote it specifically for my girlfriend as due to being away on tour all the time, we never really get to see each other."

Music video
A music video to accompany the release of "Wherever You Are" was first released onto YouTube on 15 January 2020.

Charts

Release history

References

2020 songs
2020 singles
Kodaline songs